Wen Yanfang (born October 20, 1966) is a Chinese sprint canoer who competed in the early 1990s. She won a bronze medal in the K-4 500 m event at the 1991 ICF Canoe Sprint World Championships in Paris.

Wen also finished fifth in the K-4 500 m event at the 1992 Summer Olympics in Barcelona, Spain.

References

Sports-reference.com profile

1966 births
Canoeists at the 1992 Summer Olympics
Chinese female canoeists
Living people
Olympic canoeists of China
Asian Games medalists in canoeing
ICF Canoe Sprint World Championships medalists in kayak
Canoeists at the 1990 Asian Games
Asian Games gold medalists for China
Medalists at the 1990 Asian Games